Semarapura  is a town which serves as the administrative capital of the Klungkung Regency in Bali, Indonesia.

See also 

Semarapura is the capital of Klungkung Regency, the smallest regency in the province of Bali, Indonesia. It also serves as the administrative centre of Klungkung District (kecamatan) within the regency. Klungkung Regency borders with Bangli Regency in the north, Karangasem Regency in the east, Gianyar Regency in the west and with the Indian Ocean to the south.

Klungkung Palace
The Klungkung Palace is a historical landmark in the centre of Klungkung Regency. Locally referred to as ‘Puri Agung Semarapura’ or the Royal Palace of Semarapura after the name of the town, the palace shares the same location as the unmissable and more popular Kerta Gosa or the ‘Hall of Justice’ complex, which lies just northeast of the palatial compound. Also around the complex is the Klungkung Regency cultural hall, as well as the Kerta Gosa Museum.

The Klungkung Palace grounds date back to the 17th century, and is a silent witness to much of the history of East Bali, including the Dutch colonial intervention in 1908, which led to the fall of the kingdom and deaths of most of the royal family

Nyoman Gunarsa Museum
Nyoman Gunarsa Museum, locally referred as Museum Seni Lukis Klasik, is the namesake private gallery of late Balinese maestro, Nyoman Gunarsa. This Classic Art Museum was established in 1990 and houses a collection of his classical and contemporary Balinese artworks, ranging from paintings, sculptures and antique items. The shape of the building in the Museum is a blend of modern Balinese architecture.
The museum features 3 floors, 2 of which are the main galleries displaying collections of classical paintings of Bali and the other is reserved for local and international guest artists’ exhibiting mostly modern paintings of Bali.

It is located approximately 3 km from West Semarapura.

Climate
Semarapura has a tropical rainforest climate (Af) with moderate to heavy rainfall year-round.

References

External links 
 

Populated places in Bali
Regency seats of Bali
Klungkung Regency